Pronger is a surname. Notable people with the surname include:
 Chris Pronger (born 1974), Canadian ice hockey player
 Sean Pronger (born 1972), Canadian ice hockey player